Polyhomeotic-like protein 1 is a protein that in humans is encoded by the PHC1 gene.

Function 

This gene is a homolog of the Drosophila polyhomeotic gene, which is a member of the Polycomb group of genes. The gene product is a component of a multimeric protein complex that contains EDR2 and the vertebrate Polycomb protein BMI1. The gene product, the EDR2 protein, and the Drosophila polyhomeotic protein share two highly conserved domains, named homology domains I and II. These domains are involved in protein–protein interactions and may mediate heterodimerization of the protein encoded by this gene and the EDR2 protein.

Mutations in this gene have been associated to cases of primary microcephaly.

Interactions 

PHC1 has been shown to interact with BMI1 and PHC2.

References

Further reading